The 21st Space Operations Squadron (21 SOPS) is a satellite control unit of the Space Delta 6 of the United States Space Force, located at Vandenberg Space Force Base, California. Prior to July 2020, it was part of the 50th Network Operations Group.  It operated Onizuka Air Force Station from its formation in 1991 until the closure of the station in 2010.

Mission
The mission of the 21st Space Operations Squadron is to plan and conduct specialized communications for a wide spectrum of Department of Defense, allied, civilian and national space systems. The squadron monitors, maintains and updates status of the $6.2 billion Satellite Control Network resources, providing configuration and readiness condition of controlled resources. The squadron operates four SCN remote tracking stations performing on-orbit satellite tracking, telemetry, commanding, mission data retrieval operations, pre-launch satellite test and checkout, as well as direct operations launch support. Additionally, the squadron is responsible for the operations and maintenance support of the Global Positioning System ground antennas and monitor stations at Diego Garcia Tracking Station, Kaena Point Tracking Station, and the Kwajalein Atoll, Republic of the Marshall Islands.

Operations
The 21st Space Operations Squadron supports DOD-assigned space missions by operating, maintaining and providing logistical support for the common user resources of the SCN. The 21 SOPS Network Operations Center is the prime SCN fault detection and isolation resource for the primary and additional operational switch replacement communication links. The squadron supports more than 150 DOD, allied, civil and national satellites by monitoring, maintaining and updating status of SCN communication resources, and providing configuration and readiness condition of controlled resources to multiple users and command centers.

In addition to providing worldwide SCN access, 21 SOPS also enables specialized support to the international space community by providing network communications. The unit is responsible for operating and maintaining two 38-foot Defense Information Systems Agency satellite communication antennas.

The 21st Space Operations Squadron is also responsible for all operations, maintenance and personnel performing SCN operations at Vandenberg Tracking Station, Vandenberg SFB, Calif; Diego Garcia Tracking Station, British Indian Ocean Territory; Guam Tracking Station, Andersen AFB, Guam; and Hawaii Tracking Station, Kaena Point, Hawaii. Each provides telemetry, tracking and commanding for high-priority DOD, NASA, and NATO spacecraft. Additionally, Vandenberg Tracking Station provides pre-launch compatibility and direct launch operations support to the Western Range launch complex. The squadron also hosts the 148th Space Operations Squadron (California Air National Guard), SCN Backup Network Operations Center, Global Positioning System Alternate Master Control Station, the combined Backup Satellite Operations Center for 3rd Space Operations Squadron and 4th Space Operations Squadron, as well as the Milstar Satellite Operations Center.

Component units and operating locations
The 21st Space Operations Squadron operates from several locations around the globe:

History
The birth of the National Security Space Enterprise was the Corona photo intelligence gathering satellite program. Recently declassified, this program convinced the Air Force a dedicated unit was needed to provide satellite tracking. In April 1959, the 6594th Test Wing was activated with temporary headquarters in Palo Alto, Calif. In 1960, land was purchased in Sunnyvale, Calif. and the 6594th Test Wing relocated to form the Air Force Satellite Test Center. Construction on the "Blue Cube" was completed in 1968, and on Jan. 1, 1971, the Sunnyvale facilities became Sunnyvale Air Force Station. The installation was renamed Onizuka Air Force Station on July 24, 1986, in honor of Col. Ellison Onizuka, who lost his life in the Space Shuttle Challenger accident.

The 21st Space Operations Squadron was activated on October 1, 1991, and within one year, absorbed the roles of the 2nd Satellite Tracking Group and the 1999th Communications Squadron. After the 1995 Base Realignment and Closure committee directed realignment of Onizuka AFS, 21 SOPS absorbed the roles of the 750th Space Group and all subordinate units, to include the 5th Space Operations Squadron. On 10 March 2004, the squadron became part of the 50th Network Operations Group. In 2005, the BRAC committee directed Onizuka AFS to close not later than September 15, 2011. On July 29, 2010, the squadron relocated to Vandenberg SFB after the closure of Onizuka, gaining Detachment 1, Vandenberg Tracking Station, from the 22nd Space Operations Squadron. At Vandenburg, the squadron operated the Ellison Onizuka Satellite Operations Facility. On October 1, 2010, the 50th Network Operations Group reorganized and the squadron gained Diego Garcia Tracking Station, British Indian Ocean Territory; Guam Tracking Station, Andersen AFB, Guam; and Hawaii Tracking Station, Kaena Point, Hawaii.

On August 1, 2011, the Global Positioning System (GPS) Ground Antennas and Monitoring Stations were transitioned from the 2nd Space Operations Squadron (of the 50th Operations Group) to the 21st, 22nd, 23rd Space Operations Squadrons (of the 50th Network Operations Group). At this time, 21 SOPS absorbed maintenance, quality assurance and real property responsibilities for GPS sites at Kwajalein Atoll, Diego Garcia Tracking Station and Kaena Point Tracking Station.

List of commanders

 Lt Col Sam McNiel, 2007-2009
 Lt Col Robert Pavelko, 2009-2011
 Lt Col Michael Wulfestieg, 2011–2013
 Lt Col Sean Scott, ~2014
 Lt Col Phillip Verroco, 2015–2017
 Lt Col Wade McGrew, ~2019
 Lt Col Samuel Oppelaar, 2019–2021
 Lt Col Justin Roque, 21 May 2021

References

Squadrons of the United States Space Force
Military units and formations in California
Military of the British Forces British Indian Ocean Territories